Miss Earth Malaysia 2016 was a beauty pageant to award the title of Miss Earth Malaysia. The winner was Venisa Judah of Sabah.

Placements

2016 beauty pageants
Beauty pageants in Malaysia